Peter Noyes is a former Vice-Chancellor of University of Wales, Newport.

Peter Noyes may also refer to:
Peter Noyes (Andover), English MP for Andover

Other
Peter Noyes School, Sudbury, Massachusetts